Garnik Hovsepi Addarian (in Armenian Գառնիկ Ադդարյան, also transliterated Karnig Attarian in Western Armenian) (1925–1986) was an Armenian Diasporan poet, writer and public figure, a member of Lebanese Communist Party Central Committee since 1980. He was born in Aleppo and died in Beirut.

He graduated from the French college of Aleppo and then moved to Beirut, where edited "Ejer kraganutian yev arvesdi" and "Azkayin mshaguyt" newspapers and contributed to Arabian periodicals. He was the author of numerous books including "Aprim-mernim" (Live-die, 1968), a poem collection, and "Sev yev garmir" (Black and Red, 1979) a story book.

No133 school in Yerevan is named after him.

Sources
Armenian Concise Encyclopedia, Ed. by acad. K. Khudaverdian, Yerevan, 1990, p. 43

Lebanese male poets
1925 births
1986 deaths
People from Aleppo
Syrian people of Armenian descent
Lebanese Communist Party politicians
Lebanese people of Armenian descent
Ethnic Armenian poets
20th-century Lebanese poets
20th-century male writers